Stigmella fuscotibiella is a moth of the family Nepticulidae. It is found in North America in Ohio, Pennsylvania, Kentucky, Colorado, Maine, Massachusetts, Ontario and Nova Scotia.

The wingspan is 4-4.5 mm. There are at least three generations per year and larvae may be collected from June until the end of October.

The larvae feed on Salix species, including S. nigra and S. discolor. They mine the leaves of their host plant. The mine consists of a gradually broadening linear tract, sometimes straight, but often bent back on itself toward the end. Occasionally the latter portion is a more or less a spiral blotch. The cocoon is ocherous or brownish.

External links
Nepticulidae of North America
A taxonomic revision of the North American species of Stigmella (Lepidoptera: Nepticulidae)

Nepticulidae
Moths of North America
Moths described in 1862